Konopište may refer to:
 Konopiště, a castle near the city of Benešov in the Czech Republic
 Konopište, North Macedonia, a village in the Tikveš region of North Macedonia